Alfred Underwood (1869 –  8 October 1928) was an English footballer who played 130 times for Stoke in the 1880s and 1890s.

Football career
Underwood was born in Hanley, Staffordshire and in his youth played in the local church league for Hanley Tabernacle and Etruria along with Bill Rowley. He and Rowley joined Stoke in 1887 in time for the first season of the Football League. Underwood made his league debut on 8 September 1888, at full-back for Stoke in a 2–0 defeat by West Bromwich Albion at the Victoria Ground. He played all of Stoke's 22 Football League matches in 1888–89. Underwood played at left-back in Stoke's first season in the Football League and missed only one match in the next three seasons (at Walsall in 1891). He retired in 1893 when he was only 24 after he cut his knee and the wound became infected, although he was still called up to play occasionally afterwards. Underwood then worked in the local pot banks but suffered many health problems which led to his death in 1928.

Professional Baseball
In 1890 Underwood played professional baseball for Stoke in the National League of Baseball of Great Britain.

International career
He went on to win two full England caps, appearing alongside fellow Stoke teammates Bill Rowley and Tommy Clare.

Style of play
Underwood stood at 6 ft tall and weighed 13 st and along with Tommy Clare, formed an imposing barricade and were often referred to as a pair rather than an individual. Underwood's balding head and sunken eyes gave him a demonic appearance.

His main assets were his heavy tackles and his long clearances. Members of the local press often criticised him for being too impetuous and rash. He occasionally mis-kicked his clearances and on one occasion against Accrington in September 1888, he hoofed the ball vertically in the air which resulted in Accrington scoring an easy goal. This led to The Sentinel claiming that Underwood should stop trying to break windows.

Career statistics

Club

International
Source:

Honours
Football Alliance champions: 1890–91

References

External links
 England profile

1869 births
1928 deaths
English footballers
Stoke City F.C. players
English Football League players
England international footballers
Football Alliance players
Association football fullbacks
Sportspeople from Hanley, Staffordshire
English baseball players